The Royal National City Park is a national city park, established by the Riksdag in 1995, and located in the municipalities of Stockholm, Solna and Lidingö in Sweden.

1/ km²2/ Population per km²

Gallery 
Some places in the Royal National City Park:

See also
Green belt

References

External links

Official website
Online leaflet about the park (pdf)

Parks in Stockholm
Urban public parks
Urban forests
1995 establishments in Sweden